In accounting, the concept of a freight expense or freight spend account can be generalized as a payment for sending out a product to a customer.  It falls under the umbrella category of expenses and is treated like other expense accounts in relation to the accounting equation, however, under generally accepted accounting rules, if the freight is   Freight expense has a normal debit balance.  Increases are recorded as debits while decreases are recorded as credits. In relation to other accounts, the Freight Expense account is similar to the "Cost of Sales-Freight" account, but are two totally different entities.  While the Freight Expense account is increased for payments towards outgoing goods, the Cost of Sales-Freight account is increased for payments towards incoming goods.

For example, suppose you have a business that imports and exports a type of product.  When you deliver goods to customers and you pay for the delivery costs, you increase the Freight Expense account with a debit and the Cost of Sales-Freight is unaffected.  However, when you purchase goods from a supplier and you pay for the delivery costs, you increase the Cost of Sales-Freight account and the Freight Expense account is unaffected.

Expense